An aircraft livery is a set of comprehensive insignia comprising color, graphic, and typographical identifiers which operators (airlines, governments, air forces and occasionally private and corporate owners) apply to their aircraft.

As aircraft liveries evolved in the years after the Second World War, they became a leading subset of the emerging disciplines of corporate identity and branding and among the most prominent examples of fashion. They have provided an arena for the work of distinguished designers and eminent lay people like Raymond Loewy, Alexander Girard, and Jacqueline Kennedy Onassis. The term is an adaptation of the word livery: the uniform-style clothing worn by servants of wealthy families and government representatives until the early/mid-20th century. With the advent of stagecoaches, railway trains, and steamships, the term livery spread to their decoration. Since the 1950s, elements of airline liveries permeated ground vehicles, advertising, proprietary airport furniture, airline promotional materials and aircrew uniforms in an increasingly integrated manner, spreading to airline websites in the 1990s.

Since the 1950s and 60s, aircraft liveries have usually been uniform livery across an entire fleet. One-off custom-designs might be applied from time to time to individual fleet members to highlight set occasions.

Application

Decals and/or stickers are used for geometrically challenging elements such as titles and logos.

Airline liveries

Elements

Airline liveries involve set individual elements.

The airline's title is usually set in a specific style. This is closely defined by typographical designers as a logotype. The specification covers: typeface (either a commercially available typeface, or else a specially designed and copyrighted custom typeface); type size; type case (capitals or "uppercase," upper and lowercase, lowercase only); cut (Romans or upright letters, italics or slanted letters, regular/condensed/expanded type); weight (bold, medium, light); proportion (defined as units of tight or loose setting, plus amount and degree of type kerning). Size varies according to fleet member; the larger the aircraft, the larger the titling. Since type is designed to be customarily read from a flat surface, airline livery type is often modified to fit curved aircraft surfaces. The specifications result in a logotype: a cliche of type whose characteristics remain unchanged.

The airline's monogram or emblem is defined in terms of geometry by graphic designers. The resulting specification is called a logo. Logos are also modified to fit curved surfaces and appear identical from diverse viewing angles.

The colour or colours are specified in terms of colour matching and standardisation systems like Pantone or Federal Standard 595. The resulting specification is called a colourway.

Individual aircraft types most often have individually designed liveries which appear to be identical, but are not quite the same as those applied to other aircraft types operated by the same airline. Uniform liveries became generally adopted by the 1950s and '60s. Before then, individual airlines, notably Aeroflot and some US carriers like Delta Air Lines, used custom liveries designed for each individual aircraft type they operated. Aeroflot abandoned the practice as late as 1974, adopting a uniform livery across its fleet.

Standard liveries

Bare metal 

Until after the Second World War, the "default solution" for aircraft livery design was to leave the aircraft exterior unpainted and decorated only with the airline's title, plus possibly an emblem or monogram. When the world's first all-metal airliners, such as the Boeing 247, Douglas DC-2, and Douglas DC-3, entered service in the 1930s, the sleekness of their shiny exteriors provided an imaginative canvas for livery design. At the time, paint was expensive, fairly heavy, had relatively poor adherence to metal, and was prone to early bleaching, mechanical, and chemical damage; leaving the aircraft skin largely unpainted was logical and economical.

As corrosion and paint research advanced and airliner lives lengthened, airframers began applying advanced primers and treatments to airliners during manufacture. Many airframers insisted on overall corrosion protection remaining in place throughout an airliner's service life, or at least throughout its diverse guarantee periods. This made bare metal liveries problematic; they began giving way to painted exteriors by the mid-1960s. To ensure longevity, bare metal liveries involved intensive polishing and waxing during manufacture and in service. Nevertheless, the bare metal era survived into the 21st century and the advent of plastic composite airliners like the Boeing 787 Dreamliner and Airbus A350 XWB.

The most notable proponent of the bare metal look, American Airlines, adopted a painted livery in 2013. Other passenger airlines, including Aeroflot, Aeromexico, Air Canada, CP Air, Cathay Pacific, Condor Flugdienst, JAT Yugoslav Airlines, Lufthansa, Northwest Airlines, SAS Scandinavian Airlines System, TAROM, US Airways, and Western Airlines also employed unadorned bare metal in whole or part of their liveries for set periods or as an experiment. Cargo carriers like Cargolux, Flying Tiger Line, JAL Japan Airlines Cargo, Korean Air Cargo, and Seaboard World Airlines often claimed that their bare metal liveries save weight. Counterclaims stated that extra maintenance costs cancel this benefit.

Cheatline

Among the earliest recognisable elements of aircraft liveries was the cheatline. A cheatline is a decorative horizontal stripe applied to the sides of an aircraft fuselage. The etymology of the term stems from "cheating the eye" because the first cheatlines aimed to streamline aircraft visually by reducing the staccato impact of their cabin windows. US carriers like the predecessors of United Air Lines and TWA (then Transcontinental and Western Airlines) adopted cheatlines as early as the 1920s.

Cheatlines may be in single ("rules") or multiple ("tramlines") bands, and in one or more colours. Cheatlines migrated from the window line to below or occasionally above it. They also melded other decorative elements like stylised lightning bolts, feathers, moustaches, national flags and colours, and elements of the airline's title and emblem.

The popularity of cheatlines declined from the 1970s onwards and today they are comparatively rare, except in aircraft liveries which intentionally seek to induce a retro style, perhaps suggesting long tradition.

Hockey stick

In aircraft livery design, a "hockey stick" means a continuation of the cheatline which is rotated through an angle so as to sweep upwards over the tail fin. Among the first hockey stick liveries were the Eastern Airlines' 1964 jet livery and Alitalia's 1970 livery. Hockey stick aircraft liveries remained in fashion until the late 1970s/early '80s with Cathay Pacific still having them as late as 1994.

All-over color

In 1965, Braniff International Airways hired Alexander Girard to revamp their corporate identity. The eventual design involved painting the entire aircraft fuselage in one of several single bold colourways. The airline title was logotyped as "Braniff International" in custom designed italic capitals, with the initials pasted across airliner tail fins. The livery was part of a comprehensive corporate identity revamp also involving dedicated airport lounges and including a short-lived "space helmet" headgear for cabin staff.

In 1969, Court Line Aviation hired Peter Murdoch to revamp its corporate identity. The resulting design included decorating each fleet member in one of five different colourways within a hockeystick scheme. The airline name was logotyped as "court" in custom designed lowercase italics, and could easily be changed to 'liat' when individual aircraft transferred to Court Line's Caribbean subsidiary LIAT Leeward Islands Air Transport.

Another all-over colour livery was adopted by airline group British Air Services in late 1970. Group members Northeast Airlines and Cambrian Airlines had their aircraft painted white/grey/yellow and white/grey/orange. Related pink and green liveries were designed for group members Scottish and Channel Islands Airways, but never saw service use.

Eurowhite

From the 1970s, the overall colour idea began to spread worldwide, largely in the form of "Eurowhite" liveries in which white was the dominant colour. A side benefit of the overall white look was that it helped airline asset management. It did so by facilitating the hiring-out (chartering in 1960s parlance or leasing from the 1970s) of individual fleet members during seasonal traffic troughs or economic downturns. Overall white aircraft could readily accept major elements of lessee liveries, and could equally rapidly revert to lessor liveries on return.

Notable early Eurowhite liveries included Alitalia's 1970s livery and UTA Union de Transports Aériens's early 1970s livery. TWA Trans World Airlines' 1975 livery was among the first Eurowhite schemes outside Europe. Except for a very brief Air France Pepsi logojet example, all Concorde liveries were predominantly Eurowhite-based, as this reduced heat absorption.

Jelly bean

The Braniff 1967 livery (see All-Over Color above) was also often dubbed "Jellybean." Jellybean liveries involve multiple alternative colourways in which entire aircraft or parts of them are decorated. A Jellybean variant involved decorating tail fins in different designs, as exemplified by Air India Express, displaying different Indian culture and heritage on its tail, Alaska Airline's 1972 brand refresh livery, Frontier Airlines with the images of different animals and birds on its tail, JetBlue Airways, Mexicana, Pakistan International Airlines' "ethnic tails,"  and PLUNA. British Airways’ 1997 ethnic liveries were celebrated Jellybean examples.

Billboard

The 1970s saw the emergence of Billboard liveries. This places the airline title centrestage in the livery, often at the expense of the cheatline. Early adopters of Billboard liveries included UTA Union de Transports Aériens (UTA), Seaboard World Airlines, Hughes Airwest, and LOT Polish Airlines. Western's and Pan Am's final liveries were celebrated Billboard examples. In the 1990s and 2000s, two of the three main airline alliances adopted Billboard liveries for application to selected aircraft operated by alliance member airlines. Low-cost carriers such as Ryanair and easyJet have also employed the use of Billboard liveries on their aircraft.

Specialized liveries

Commemorative liveries

Commemorative liveries are used to celebrate a milestone in an airline’s history, including anniversaries.

One such example would be ATA Airlines "25th-anniversary" paint scheme, celebrating the airline's inception under George Mikelson, the founder of American Trans Air, or SkyWest Airlines paint scheme used to commemorate the 30th anniversary of that airline.

South African Airways had one of their Boeing 747-300s specially painted in rainbow colors to transport the South African Olympic team to the 2000 Summer Olympics in Sydney, Australia. The aircraft was dubbed the Ndizani.

Heritage or retro liveries

A heritage livery is a restoration of a past livery for publicity purposes or to stress the length of an airline's experience or tradition. Airlines, the media, and enthusiasts call aircraft painted in heritage liveries "Retrojets."

Logo 

Airlines often apply and paint specialized liveries to their standard airline liveries and logos of their aircraft.

a logo when used for charter service; sports teams and touring rock bands are common examples
a logo of a prominent charity, when the airline and charity have a partnership
images of a city, usually a hub or other city of importance to the airline
advertising for a company (logojet)

Southwest Airlines is famous for its various liveries promoting Sea World (painted to resemble an Orca), various US states where Southwest has operations (painted to resemble the states' flags), and other entities such as the NBA and the Ronald McDonald House.

Boeing painted a pre-delivery 747-8 to commemorate the Seattle Seahawks' 2014 National Football Conference Championship and appearance in Super Bowl XLVIII. The livery features the Seahawks logo and a "12" on the tail in reference to the team's fans, who are known collectively as "the 12th man." An update in 2015, with "In it to win it!" added to the aft fuselage, appeared in a flyover of Lake Washington during the Boeing Seafair Air Show in August of that year.

Marketing 

All Nippon Airways has featured a number of aircraft in a promotional Pokémon livery, known as the Pokémon Jet. EVA Air partnered with Sanrio to create a number of "Hello Kitty Jets."

Other air marketing liveries

Alliance brands 

Three multinational worldwide airline alliances have grown and developed their own aircraft liveries and corporate identities which encompass and transcend major carriers, mainline carriers, legacy carriers, and flag airlines' individual airline identities along with any ties to regional, geopolitical, national boundaries, and government heritages.

Oneworld, SkyTeam, and Star Alliance are the mutually agreed upon "airline alliance liveries" of large numbers of independent and separately owned airlines working together as one through a system of codeshare agreements, rather than the colors of any one certificated airline.

Unlike the other airline alliance consortium members, Oneworld will retain the "jellytail" airline logo markings of their individual airline alliance partner members upon each member airline's vertical stabilizer.

Regional brands

Similar in terms of how multiple different airlines fly aircraft in full branding of standard OneWorld, SkyTeam, and Star Alliance liveries, in the United States along with many other parts of the world, large airlines often operate in association with other airlines which operate much smaller regional airliners so smaller communities are linked to an airlines large airline hub.

To offer air travelers what appears as a seamless association with an airline that is much larger, more prominent, well known, or publicly perceived as more safe, major North American airlines have developed a system of affiliate air carriers.

These feeder airlines operate regional jets and other types of smaller utility air-taxi type aircraft, typically painted in ways that mimic (whether through distinctive fonts, colour combinations, or cheatline arrangements) the respective liveries of the operators with which they are affiliated. They may carry sub-branding such as Airlink, Connection, Eagle, or Express  juxtaposed with the more widely recognised carrier name.

A recent trend, in North America is for the regional airline d/b/a  Express, Eagle, or Connection,  is to operate the aircraft in full mainline airline markings, leaving the operating regional airlines name in only very small letters, close to the forward entry door. Such brandings noted to cause confusion among travelers, as in the case of the Colgan Air Continental Connection Flight 3407 crash in which people identified the flight with Continental Airlines, although it was actually flown by Colgan Air.

Non airline liveries

Government 

Air transports of heads of state and government are often painted in unique color schemes. The US President's aircraft, Air Force One, uses a light-blue and sky-blue color scheme, with the Seal of the President of the United States just above the front gear and the flag of the United States on the tailfin. The livery was designed by French-American industrial designer Raymond Loewy at the instigation, and with the help of, then-First Lady Jacqueline Kennedy.

Aircraft carrying state or government leaders are often liveried in national colors or the insignia of a particular government office.

Military 

Military aircraft often make use of aircraft camouflage to make the aircraft more difficult to see in the air and on the ground. This form of camouflage makes use of light and color patterns, and is dependent upon environmental conditions and is mainly effective against human observers, though some electronic visual acquisition systems can be affected. Visual camouflage does not protect an aircraft against radar location or heat-seeking electronics.

Since the release of MIL-STD-2161 in 1993, the US Navy's tactical aircraft use a color scheme designed to reduce visual detection that consists of shades of flat gray with exterior markings applied in a contrasting shade of gray. Note that the stated purpose of this document is to standardize paint schemes and application of naval insignia and markings.

Aircraft camouflage was first used during World War I and was employed extensively during the first half of World War II. After radar detection systems were developed, aircraft camouflage became less important to the Allies, and a number of late-war Allied aircraft were brought to battle with no camouflage. Subsequent camouflage schemes, when used, concentrated on hiding the aircraft from aerial observation while it was resting on or flying near the ground, or they used a light, neutral color to inhibit detection while in the air. Modern camouflage schemes have experimented with light-emitting active camouflage systems which seek to conceal the aircraft from human vision or to blur or confuse optical observation by electronic means.

See also

Aircraft camouflage
Aircraft marking
List of airline liveries and logos
Antique aircraft
Nose art
Roundel

References

External links 
 

Aircraft liveries